The Societies Act 1966, is a Malaysian laws which enacted relating to registration of societies.

Structure
The Societies Act 1966, in its current form (1 January 2006), consists of 3 Parts containing 70 sections and 2 schedules (including 10 amendments).
 Part I: Provisions Applicable to Societies Generally
 Part IA: Provisions Applicable to Political Parties Only
 Part II: Provisions Applicable to Mutual Benefit Societies Only
 Part III: Miscellaneous Provisions Applicable to Societies Generally
 Schedules

See also
 Brunei: Societies Act 1948, Societies Act 2005 
 Hong Kong: Societies Ordinance 1949
 India: Societies Registration Act, 1860
 Singapore: Societies Act 1966
 Swiss Verein
 Company limited by guarantee

References

External links
 Societies Act 1966 

1966 in Malaysian law
Malaysian federal legislation